Tina Trachtenburg (née Piña ), known by her stage name Mother Pigeon is a street performance artist in New York City. In a typical show, she arranges an art installation of hand made soft sculptures representing pigeons and other urban wildlife while she sits among them. The art is for fun and to promote animal rights for pigeons, rats in New York City, and other animals. Her exhibitions are intended to improve the reputations of animals who are "maligned" and "overlooked".

Mother Pigeon lives in Bushwick, Brooklyn.

Some art lovers say the pigeons seem real until examined closely.
Before becoming a solo street performer and activist, Mother Pigeon was a member of the Trachtenburg Family Slideshow Players, a self-described "indie-vaudeville-conceptual-art rock" band that consisted of Mother Pigeon's husband, Jason, and their only child Rachel, who is a musician, model and actress.

References

External links
A New York gem: This woman is ‘mother’ to hundreds of pigeons, a three-minute video documentary presented the New York Post
Mother Pigeon, a three-minute video documentary of a typical day for Mother Pigeon

Performance art in New York City
Urban wildlife
Living people
Year of birth missing (living people)
American animal rights activists
American performance artists
Artists from Brooklyn
People from Bushwick, Brooklyn
Columbidae
American women performance artists
21st-century American women